IDS HR in Practice is a subscription-based online service offering analysis and coverage of best practice in all major areas of HR. It features named case studies and benchmarking data on a wide range of employee benefits and allowances. The HR module of IDS Thomson Reuters, the service was launched in 2012 and is the successor to the fortnightly journal IDS HR Studies. A subscription to IDS HR in Practice includes access to the content of IDS HR Studies back to 2003.

IDS HR in Practice is published by Incomes Data Services, a subsidiary of Sweet & Maxwell which is itself owned by Thomson Reuters.

The service is used by companies, trade unions, consultants and other employment-related organisations.

Best practice case studies 
IDS HR in Practice provides analysis and named company case studies of best practice on all major HR topics, including:

 Absence management
 Alcohol and drugs policies
 Assessment centres
 Coaching and mentoring
 Corporate social responsibility
 Discipline, grievance and mediation
 e-HR
 e-learning
 Employee assistance programmes
 Employee engagement
 Employee health and well-being
 Employer branding
 Flexible benefits
 Flexible working
 Improving staff retention
 Internet and e-mail policies
 Job evaluation
 Job families
 Leadership development
 Managing redundancy
 Performance management
 Succession planning
 Talent management
 Total reward
 Training strategies
 Work-life balance

Benchmarking data 
IDS HR in Practice includes benchmarking data on a wide range of employee benefits and allowances, including:

 Annual hours
 Bonus schemes
 Employee share schemes
 Flexitime schemes
 Hours and holidays
 London allowances
 Overtime
 Shift pay
 Sick pay
 Standby and call-out pay

References

In the press 
 What is your redundancy cheque worth? - 10 July 2008

 HR departments have survived the recession with relatively few job cuts – 14 December 2009

Human resource management